Indian Mound Village is an unincorporated community in Seminole County, Florida, United States, located on the St. Johns River.

The community takes its name from a nearby Indian burial mound, likely Timucuan. However, the namesake burial mounds have not been left intact, minimizing the archeological value.

History
The area was originally subdivided into 116 lots in 1926 by the Davey-Winston Organization Inc. of Sanford, Florida.

The county approved construction of a water distribution system to the community in 1967.

Notes

Unincorporated communities in Seminole County, Florida
Unincorporated communities in Florida